Loma Linda (Spanish for "Beautiful Hill") is a city in San Bernardino County, California, United States, that was incorporated in 1970. The population was 24,791 at the 2020 census, up from 23,261 at the 2010 census. The central area of the city was originally known as Mound City, while its eastern half was originally the unincorporated community of Bryn Mawr.

History

The Tongva village of Wa’aachnga, or as the Spanish referred to it as the Guachama Rancheria, was located at what is now Loma Linda. The rancheria was later occupied by the Cahuilla and Serrano after it was established as a mission outpost for Mission San Gabriel in the early 1800s.

In the late 1800s, Loma Linda began as a development of tourist halls called Mound City, as encouraged by railroad companies. Shops and cottages were built, but the project would later fail. During the late 1890s, a group of businessmen and physicians from Los Angeles bought the Mound City Hotel and reopened it as a convalescent home and health resort. They called it Loma Linda, meaning 'beautiful hill' in Spanish. 

In 1905 Seventh-day Adventists John Burden and Ellen G. White purchased the Loma Linda Hotel and property and reopened it as the Loma Linda Sanitarium. In February 1906, The Loma Linda College of Evangelists was established.

In 1969, San Timoteo Creek overflowed its banks, inundating two-thirds of Loma Linda. Many of the bridges over the creek washed away, and Loma Linda Academy was completely flooded. In 2010, the creek again flooded parts of Loma Linda.

The city was incorporated in 1970.

Geography
Loma Linda is located in southwestern San Bernardino County and is considered part of the Inland Empire. It is bordered on the north by the city of San Bernardino, on the east by Redlands, on the west by Colton, and on the south by Riverside County. An area of unincorporated territory in Riverside County separates Loma Linda from the city of Moreno Valley to the south. The remnants of Bryn Mawr, an unincorporated community formerly located between Loma Linda and Redlands, were annexed by the city in 2008.

Loma Linda is in the southern San Bernardino Valley. The southern third of the city is known as the South Hills; this rugged and hilly area at the northwestern end of the Badlands is a city-owned open space reserve protected by a local initiative. San Timoteo Creek flows from southeast to northwest through the city.

Water contamination and air pollution
Ground water near Loma Linda is contaminated by a plume of the chemical perchlorate which was used in the manufacturing of solid rocket fuel. This chemical was also formerly (decades ago and in very small amounts) prescribed by physicians to control the overactive thyroid glands of certain patients. A nearby plant operated by Lockheed Aerospace has been implicated in the improper disposal of the rocket fuel ingredient, which leached into the ground water northeast of Loma Linda. Loma Linda's municipal water supply, nevertheless, has been unaffected by the plume, primarily because Lockheed Martin installed a $19 million treatment plant in 2010 to remove both perchlorate and trichloroethylene from water after pumping it from the aquifer.

Demographics

2010
At the 2010 Census, Loma Linda had a population of 23,261. The racial makeup of Loma Linda was 47.8% White (11,122 people; 37.0% Non-Hispanic White); 8.7% African American (2,032 people); 0.4% Native American (97 people); 28.3% Asian (6,589 people); 0.7% Pacific Islander (154 people); 8.7% from other races (2,022 people); and 5.4% from two or more races (1,245 people). Hispanic or Latino of any race were 5,171 people (22.2%).

The census reported that 22,457 people (96.5% of the population) lived in households, 562 (2.4%) lived in non-institutionalized group quarters, and 242 (1.0%) were institutionalized.

There were 8,764 households, 2,650 (30.2%) had children under the age of 18 living in them, 3,832 (43.7%) were opposite-sex married couples living together, 1,190 (13.6%) had a female householder with no husband present, 461 (5.3%) had a male householder with no wife present. There were 351 (4.0%) unmarried opposite-sex partnerships, and 46 (0.5%) same-sex married couples or partnerships, while 2,453 households (28.0%) were one person and 837 (9.6%) had someone living alone who was 65 or older. The average household size was 2.56. There were 5,483 families (62.6% of households); the average family size was 3.18.

The age distribution was 4,859 people (20.9%) under the age of 18, 2,642 people (11.4%) aged 18 to 24, 7,463 people (32.1%) aged 25 to 44, 5,056 people (21.7%) aged 45 to 64, and 3,241 people (13.9%) who were 65 or older. The median age was 33.2 years. For every 100 females, there were 88.0 males. For every 100 females age 18 and over, there were 83.9 males.

There were 9,649 housing units at an average density of 1,283.6 per square mile, of the occupied units 3,432 (39.2%) were owner-occupied and 5,332 (60.8%) were rented. The homeowner vacancy rate was 2.5%; the rental vacancy rate was 9.9%. 9,496 people (40.8% of the population) lived in owner-occupied housing units and 12,961 people (55.7%) lived in rental housing units.

2000
At the 2000 Census, there were 18,681 people in 7,536 households, including 4,498 families, in the city. The racial makeup of the city was 54.2% White, 7.2% African American, 0.5% Native American, 24.4% Asian, 0.2% Pacific Islander, 7.5% from other races, and 6.1% from two or more races. Hispanic or Latino of any race were 16.3%.

Of the 7,536 households 27.1% had children under the age of 18 living with them, 43.7% were married couples living together, 12.0% had a female householder with no husband present, and 40.3% were non-families. Of all households 31.2% were one person and 10.5% were one person aged 65 or older. The average household size was 2.4 and the average family size was 3.1.

The age distribution was 21.9% under the age of 18, 10.2% from 18 to 24, 33.2% from 25 to 44, 19.2% from 45 to 64, and 15.4% 65 or older. The median age was 34 years. For every 100 females, there were 86.4 males. For every 100 females age 18 and over, there were 82.2 males.

The median household income was $38,204 and the median family income was $45,774. Males had a median income of $36,086 versus $35,096 for females. The per capita income for the city was $20,189. About 12.9% of families and 15.1% of the population were below the poverty line, including 18.6% of those under age 18 and 5.2% of those age 65 or over. Whether or not these poverty statistics include unemployed full-time students is not known.

Longevity 
Residents in Loma Linda have one of the highest rates of longevity in the United States. Writer Dan Buettner has labeled Loma Linda a Blue Zone, an area where the longevity is appreciably higher than the national average and a substantial proportion of the population lives past 100 years. Buettner's 2008 book, The Blue Zones: Lessons for Living Longer From the People Who've Lived the Longest, attributes Loma Linda's longevity rate to Adventist cultural health and diet practices.
The city strictly controls the sale of alcohol and has banned public smoking. The church-owned grocery store does not sell meat.

Government
Loma Linda uses the council-manager form of government, and the City Council is composed of Mayor Rhodes Rigsby, Phill Dupper, Ovidiu Popescu, Ron Dailey, and pro tempore John Lenart.

Police services are provided by the San Bernardino County Sheriff's Office.

State and federal representation

Education
The city of Loma Linda forms part of the Redlands Unified School District, with Bryn Mawr Elementary School being situated within Loma Linda city limits. However, the western edge of the city is served by the Colton Unified School District. Also located in the city are Loma Linda Academy, a K-12 school, and Loma Linda University (LLU), a health-sciences higher-learning institution, both run by the Seventh-day Adventist Church. Notable firsts at Loma Linda University's medical center include the first baboon-to-human heart transplant and the first split-brain surgery.

Sister cities
Loma Linda is twinned with Manipal, India, and Libertador San Martin, Argentina, as its sister cities.

In popular culture
Loma Linda University Medical Center is featured in Venom ER, an Animal Planet program focusing on snakebite treatment at the hospital. Former Loma Linda resident and heart surgeon Ellsworth Wareham was featured in the 2009 documentary film How to Live Forever.

Seventh-day Adventist influence 
Nearly half of the city's residents are members of the Seventh-day Adventist Church, a Protestant denomination founded in 1863 that observes Sabbath from sundown on Friday to sundown on Saturday. In 1904, Seventh-day Adventist church guided by the visions of prophet Ellen G. White purchased a failed resort in the city to create a sanitarium and nursing school. In 1909, the church opened a school of medicine that eventually became Loma Linda University Medical Center. The Loma Linda Foods company was founded in Loma Linda in 1905 by the Seventh-day Adventists.

Seventh-day Adventist institutions in the city include the Loma Linda University Church and the Loma Linda Academy. Because many members of the Adventist faith are vegetarians, there are many vegetarian options in Loma Linda restaurants and vegetarian restaurants including Vegan Fresh in the downtown area. The Loma Linda Market grocery store does not sell any red meat, poultry, or seafood.

The city is a Blue Zone, where residents live longer than average, and this is attributed to the healthy lifestyle of the many Adventist residents in Loma Linda.

Notable people 

 Baby Fae, first infant xenotransplant subject
 Brent Mayne, former catcher for the Kansas City Royals and San Francisco Giants.
 Matthew Modine, actor best known for his role in Full Metal Jacket
 Don Vesco, motorcycle racer in Motorsports Hall of Fame of America
 Loree Sutton, retired United States Army general and candidate in the 2021 New York City Democratic mayoral primary
 Ellsworth Wareham, centenarian former surgeon and World War II veteran.

References

External links

 

 
1970 establishments in California
Blue zones
Cities in San Bernardino County, California
Incorporated cities and towns in California
Populated places established in 1970
Populated places on the Santa Ana River
Seventh-day Adventist Church in North America